Johannes Lauridsen (25 December 1930, Frederikshavn – 25 October 2006) was a Danish long distance runner. Lauridsen took part in the 1960 Summer Olympics in Rome, placing 41st in the marathon with a time of 2:32:32. He won the 8 km race at the 1956 .

References

1930 births
2006 deaths
Danish male marathon runners
Athletes (track and field) at the 1960 Summer Olympics
Olympic athletes of Denmark
People from Frederikshavn
Sportspeople from the North Jutland Region